Nogales (Spanish for "walnut trees") may refer to:

Chile
 Nogales, Chile

Mexico
 Nogales, Durango, Coneto de Comonfort Municipality
 Nogales, Sonora
 Nogales Municipality, Sonora

 Nogales, Veracruz
 Nogales Municipality, Veracruz

Spain
 Nogales, Badajoz, a municipality in the province of Badajoz, Extremadura

United States
 Nogales, Arizona
 Nogales High School (La Puente, California)

People with the surname
 Manuel Chaves Nogales (1897–1944), Spanish journalist and writer
 Eva Nogales, Spanish biophysicist
 José Nogales (1860–1908), Spanish journalist and writer
Rafael de Nogales, Venezuelan adventurer

See also
 Battle of Nogales (disambiguation)
 Nogales High School (disambiguation)
 Nogales Municipality (disambiguation)
 Los Nogales, a historic home in Seguin, Texas, United States